Artie Schiller (foaled April 23, 2001 in Kentucky) is a retired American Thoroughbred racehorse. Bred by Haras du Mezeray of Ticheville, Orne in Lower Normandy, France, he was out of the mare Hidden Light, a daughter of multiple Grade I winner, Majestic Light. His sire was El Prado, the 1991 Irish Champion Two-Year-Old and who became the Leading sire in North America in 2002.

A turf specialist, Artie Schiller was purchased and raced by William Entenmann of Timber Bay Farm and his daughter Denise Walsh, and was named after Entenmann's childhood friend. He was conditioned for racing by Jimmy Jerkens. At age two the colt won two of his five starts then at age three won five of eight outings including the Jamaica Handicap in which he set a new Belmont Park course record for nine furlongs. At Lone Star Park in Grand Prairie, Texas, he was sent off as the betting favorite for the 2004 Breeders' Cup Mile but finished twelfth in the fourteen-horse field.

Racing at age four, Artie Schiller had his best earnings year and most important career win. After winning the 2005 Maker's Mark Mile Stakes and the Bernard Baruch Handicap, he was sent to Belmont Park where under jockey Garrett Gomez he won the Breeders' Cup Mile, defeating runnerup Leroidesanimaux by nearly two lengths. At age five, he made three starts without a win but earned a second in the 2006 Maker's Mark Mile Stakes and a third in the Dixie Stakes.

Artie Schiller was retired from racing in August 2006 and entered stud for the 2007 season at Hurricane Hall in Lexington, Kentucky. Afterward, he was moved to Paul's Mills, KY, then to WinStar Farm, Versailles, KY, while shuttling to Australia. In 2017 he was permanently stationed in Australia and stood at Independent Stallion Station & Emirates Park Stud before relocating to Stockwell Thoroughbreds in Diggers Rest, Victoria, where he currently stands.

Stud Record

Artie Schiller's descendants include:

c = colt, f = filly

References
 Artie Schiller's pedigree and partial racing stats

 Official race details and race video of the 2005 Breeders' Cup Mile

 Stockwell Thoroughbreds 

2001 racehorse births
Racehorses bred in Kentucky
Racehorses trained in the United States
Breeders' Cup Mile winners
Thoroughbred family 13-c